Harvey School was a college preparatory school in Mandeville, Louisiana in the late 19th century. Andrew Querbes, then of New Orleans and later the mayor of Shreveport, attended the school.

References

Preparatory schools in Louisiana
Schools in St. Tammany Parish, Louisiana